Ulrich of Richenthal (died c. 1438) was a chronicler of the Council of Constance.

Ulrich was a citizen of Konstanz (Constance). He was a landowner and a layman, perhaps a son of the town clerk of Constance, Johannes Richenthal, who lived in the second half of the fourteenth century. During the session of the Ecumenical Council of Constance, Ulrich frequently came into connection with the fathers assembled. He met the papal delegates who had to provide quarters for the members of the council. He was employed in business matters by princes who were present in the city during the council, and a bishop lived in his house. Ulrich followed the council, the great events that took place in it, the festivities, and all the celebrations of which his native town was the theatre. He wrote in the German dialect of Konstanz an exact and careful account of all, introducing much statistical matter. This chronicle is preserved in several manuscripts, of which one at St. Petersburg is in Latin. The manuscripts contain coats-of-arms and other historically valuable illustrations.

This article incorporates text from the public domain Catholic Encyclopedia.

External links 

1438 deaths
German chroniclers
15th-century German historians
Year of birth unknown
Year of death uncertain